Kleinsölk is a former municipality in the district of Liezen in Styria, Austria. Since the 2015 Styria municipal structural reform, it is part of the municipality Sölk.

Gallery

References

Schladming Tauern
Rottenmann and Wölz Tauern
Cities and towns in Liezen District